Blag, Steal and Borrow is Koopa's debut studio album released solely in Japan on April 30, 2007 through Pyropit Records. The band themselves have distributed copies of the album in the UK particularly as free giveaways and as part of merchandise deals. The whole album is available in download form both as a whole and as separate tracks.

Official track list
The official track list for the limited edition press of this album was revealed on Koopa's official website.

 "Blag, Steal and Borrow"
 "Erin's Main Obession"
 "Livin' Everythin'"
 "MiniSkirts"
 "Legend"
 "Save (Our Days)"
 "Crappy"
 "The Random Tramp Song"
 "Lost in Madrid"
 "Noodles & Bubblegum"
 "Inbred"
 "Hook, Line & Singer"
 "Fake"
 "How True"
 "Pop Rock Factory"
 "Unique"
 "No Trend"
 "Us & You"
 "500 Miles"

Personnel
Oliver Cooper - vocals, guitar
Joe Murphy - vocals, bass
Stuart Cooper - drums

References

2007 debut albums